Protosphagnum nervatum is the only known species of order Protosphagnales. It is only known from the Permian fossil record. In many ways, it resembles the living moss genus Sphagnum, though its leaf cells are not as strongly dimorphic as in Sphagnum.

References

Sphagnopsida
Monotypic moss genera
Prehistoric plant genera
Permian plants